The Murder is the fifth solo studio album by American rapper Boondox from Covington, Georgia. It was released on March 24, 2017, via Majik Ninja Entertainment, making it his first project since leaving Psychopathic Records in April 2015.

Background
In May 2015, at a concert in Colorado, Boondox had a guest appearance, where it was stated that he had left Psychopathic Records to sign with Majik Ninja Entertainment. After speculation began at the Gathering of the Juggalos that Boondox was on Majik Ninja Entertainment. In October 2015 via Facebook, Boondox stated that he was not signed to Majik Ninja Entertainment nor was he in negotiations to sign with them.

In early/mid-2016, Boondox stated via social media that he has been traveling to Detroit to record his new album. In mid-2016 via social media outlets, Majik Ninja Entertainment announced that a new album titled The Murder would be out soon. Speculation began that Boondox was signed to the label with nothing being said. At the 2016 Rock & Shock MNE Seminar on October 10, 2016, Monoxide Child stated that Boondox was signed to the label. On December 10, 2016, it was officially announced that Boondox was on the label. In addition, the first single, "PYEO (Peck Your Eyes Out)", was released and was accompanied by a music video on December 10, 2016.

Promotion
In mid-2016, it was announced that a new album on Majik Ninja Entertainment titled The Murder would be released soon. On December 10, 2016, it was announced that Boondox was signed to the label and his new album would be released in 2017. The same day, "PYEO (Peck Your Eyes Out)" was released as the first single along with an accompanying music video. On December 12, 2016, G-Mo Skee posted on his social media accounts that he was recording a verse for Boondox's new album. On December 30, 2016, at 7:00 pm EST, the official release date was announced via Boondox's official Facebook page. The release date is March 24, 2017, with pre-orders going up on February 3, 2017. It was also announced on December 30, 2016, that Boondox would be embarking on "The Murder Tour" in 2017 with supporting acts Blaze Ya Dead Homie and Lex "The Hex" Master. On January 4, 2017, via their Facebook account Gorilla Voltage announced that they had just finished their verse for the album.

On February 24, 2017, the second single titled "Bloodletting" was released via dreadcenteral.com. On March 9, 2017, the third single titled "Born in Fire" featuring Jamie Madrox, Bubba Sparxxx and Struggle Jennings was released via hiphopdx.com.

Singles/music videos
On December 10, 2016, the first single for the song "PYEO (Peck Your Eyes Out)" was released, and was accompanied by a music video.

On February 24, 2017, the second single titled "Bloodletting" was released and was accompanied by a music video.

On March 9, 2017, via HipHopDX, the single titled "Born in Fire" featuring Jamie Madrox, Bubba Sparxxx and Struggle Jennings (who is the grandson to country music legend Waylon Jennings) was released.

On March 23, 2017, HipHopDX released the single "Outlined in Chalk". The single is different from the studio version due to Gorilla Voltage not being signed to the label in time for the albums turn in date. The song features Twiztid, Blaze Ya Dead Homie, The R.O.C., Lex "The Hex" Master, G-Mo Skee, Gorilla Voltage and Young Wicked.

On March 24, 2017, Roughstock.com premiered the single "Throw Away".

Track listing

Personnel
David Hutto – main artist
James Spaniolo – featured artist (tracks: 3, 7, 9, 11–14)
Paul Robert Methric – featured artist (tracks: 7, 11)
Warren Anderson Mathis – featured artist (track 9)
Will Harness – featured artist (track 9)
Bryan Jones – featured artist (track 11)
Chris Rouleau – featured artist (track 11)
James Garcia – featured artist (track 11)
Jaron Johnson – featured artist (track 11)
Lex "The Hex" Master – featured artist (track 11)
Dustin Pruitt – additional vocals (tracks: 1, 4, 8–10, 12)
Jake Polzin – additional vocals (tracks: 3, 10)
Michael Summers – producer (tracks: 2, 4–14)
William Washington – producer (track 3)
Fritz "The Cat" Van Kosky – recording and engineering (tracks: 1, 3, 4, 6–8, 10, 11)
Elliot Eide – recording and engineering (tracks: 2, 5, 9, 12–14)
Robert Rebeck – mixing (tracks: 1, 5, 7–14)
Chris Paxton – mixing (tracks: 2–4, 6)
Neil Simpson – mastering
Marc Nader – photography
Amanda Duchow – photography
Eric Shetler – design and layout
George Vlahakis – management

Charts

References

External links

2017 albums
Boondox albums
Albums produced by WLPWR
Majik Ninja Entertainment albums
Albums produced by Seven (record producer)